Isverna is a commune located in Mehedinți County, Oltenia, Romania. It is composed of eight villages: Busești, Cerna-Vârf, Drăghești, Giurgiani, Isverna, Nadanova, Seliștea and Turtaba.

References

Communes in Mehedinți County
Localities in Oltenia